The 1984 Torneo Godó or Trofeo Conde de Godó was a men's tennis tournament that took place on outdoor clay courts at the Real Club de Tenis Barcelona in Barcelona, Catalonia in Spain. It was the 32nd edition of the tournament and was part of the 1984 Grand Prix circuit. It was held from 1 October until 7 October 1984. First-seeded Mats Wilander won his third consecutive singles title at the event.

Finals

Singles
 Mats Wilander defeated  Joakim Nyström 7–6, 6–4, 0–6, 6–2
 It was Wilander's 2nd singles title of the year and 15th of his career.

Doubles
 Pavel Složil /  Tomáš Šmíd defeated  Martín Jaite /  Víctor Pecci 6–2, 6–0

References

External links
 Official tournament website
 ITF tournament edition details
 ATP tournament profile

Barcelona Open (tennis)
Torneo Godó
Torneo Godó
Torneo Godó